Gangs of Chicago is a 1940 film, starring Lloyd Nolan, Barton MacLane, Lola Lane, Ray Middleton, Astrid Allwyn, and Horace McMahon. Alan Ladd has a small uncredited role.

Plot
After the death of his corrupt father, young Matty Burns enrolls in law school, not to seek justice but to learn how to represent criminal organizations while remaining within the law. He graduates with roommate Bill Whitaker, a judge's son, and is invited to come live at the Whitaker farm, where June Whitaker finds herself attracted to her brother Bill's friend.

With a federal agent named Evans keeping a close eye on his activities, Matty becomes the legal mouthpiece of Jim Ramsey, a racketeer. Bill is beseeched by agent Evans to spy on his friend, which he does reluctantly at the urging of his law-abiding dad.

Ramsey and his moll, Virginia Brandt, don't trust Bill and spring a trap, catching him red-handed seeking evidence. Bill is seriously wounded by thug Pinky's gunshot and rushed to a doctor by Matty, his friend. Both later hide out at the family farm, where Ramsey and his men come to finish the job. They are vanquished, but Matty must now do time behind bars.

Cast
 Lloyd Nolan as Matty Burns
 Barton MacLane as Jim Ramsey
 Lola Lane as June Whitaker
 Ray Middleton as Bill Whitaker
 Astrid Allwyn as Virginia
 Addison Richards as Evans
 Howard Hickman as Judge Whitaker
 Horace McMahon as Cry-Baby
 Dwight Frye as Pinky

Production
The film was announced in March 1940 with Nolan and Lubin attached. Lubin had just finished directing Black Friday. Filming started in late March 1940. It was shot at Grand National Studios.

It was one of the last appearances of Dwight Frye.

Reception
The Los Angeles Times said Nolan and Middleton are "very good, but it is really Lola Lane... who rings bells." The New York Times called it "a stock cops and robbers melodrama... the only surprise in the picture is the sincere performance turned in by Ray Middleton."

The film was banned in Chicago by the censors. However they allowed the film to be released there after Republic changed the title to Gangs of a City.

Diabolique called it "a classy B".

References

External links

Gangs of Chicago at Letterbox DVD

1940 films
1940 crime drama films
Films directed by Arthur Lubin
American crime drama films
Films produced by Robert North
American black-and-white films
1940s English-language films
1940s American films